One Man and His Dog is a BBC television series in the United Kingdom featuring sheepdog trials, originally presented by Phil Drabble, with commentary by Eric Halsall and, later, by Ray Ollerenshaw. It was first aired on 17 February 1976 and continues today (since 2013) as a special annual edition of Countryfile. In 1994, Robin Page replaced Drabble as the main presenter. Gus Dermody took over as commentator until 2012.

At its peak, in the early 1980s, it attracted audiences in excess of eight million.

History
The last regular series aired in 1999 on BBC Two; however, the same year also saw the first of a series of Christmas specials, which continued annually until 2011 and were contested by teams of shepherds from the four nations of England, Scotland, Wales and Ireland, in the three categories of Single, Brace and Young Handlers. The main hosts have been Clarissa Dickson Wright, followed by Ben Fogle (initially with co-host Shauna Lowry), and Kate Humble.

Matt Baker joined the programme as a co-commentator (alongside Dermody) in 2006, and additionally became the main host in 2011. In 2012, the show was broadcast in two parts (the first of which was shown live) in September, and Baker was joined as a main presenter by Michaela Strachan. Dermody remained as a commentator until 2012.

The BBC has continued to broadcast sheepdog trials in a standalone series on BBC Alba – the programme Farpaisean Chon-Chaorach has covered the Scottish National Sheep Dog Trial, International Sheep Dog Trial and triennial World Trial in its 13 series since 2008.

Cancellation and merger with Countryfile
In July 2013, it was announced that One Man and His Dog was to cease being a programme in its own right, but the competition would become part of the rural affairs show Countryfile on BBC One.

The first broadcast within Countryfile was on 27 October 2013, presented by Baker (who also continued as co-commentator) and Julia Bradbury. The Brace round was discontinued. Dermody was credited in 2013 as a consultant to the programme, but was no longer one of the commentators (replaced by Andy Jackman). For the 2014 competition, broadcast within the 28 September edition of Countryfile, Baker co-presented with Helen Skelton. The 2015 competition was broadcast on 27 September 2015 and presented by Baker and Ellie Harrison. The 2017 competition, presented by Baker and Charlotte Smith, was broadcast on 24 September 2017, and saw the reinstatement of the Brace round.

Comedians Tim Vine and Kiri Pritchard-McLean competed in a special celebrity version entitled One Red Nose and Their Dog. Training footage featured in Countryfile on 6 March 2022, with the competition broadcast on Comic Relief night (18 March 2022).

Presenters and commentators

 Phil Drabble (1976–1993)
 Eric Halsall (1976–1990)
 Ray Ollerenshaw (1991–1993)
 Robin Page (1994–2000)
 Gus Dermody (1994–1999, 2007–2012)
 Clarissa Dickson-Wright (2000–2002)
 Ben Fogle (2002–2007)
 Shauna Lowry (2002–2006)
 Matt Baker (2006–present)
 Kate Humble (2008–2011)
 Michaela Strachan (2012)
 Julia Bradbury (2013)
 Helen Skelton (2014, 2019)
 Ellie Harrison (2015)
 Anita Rani (2016, 2018)
 Charlotte Smith (2017, 2020)

Transmissions

Main series

Specials

Seasonal series

References

External links

BBC Television shows
1976 British television series debuts
1970s British television series
1980s British television series
1990s British television series
2000s British television series